The 2016 Indoor Football League season was the eighth season of the Indoor Football League (IFL). Playing with ten teams in two conferences located primarily in mid-level cities in the central United States, the league's regular season kicked off on February 20, 2016 and ended on June 24, 2016. The playoffs were held in three rounds, with the top seed in each conference receiving a first-round bye as the second and third seeds facing each other in the conference semifinal (both division winners had automatic bids, and the third seed was a wild card), with the winner of that game facing the top seed in a conference championship game followed by the winners of those games meeting in the United Bowl.

Teams
All ten teams from the previous season were scheduled to return, and a new team called the Spokane Empire joined the IFL. The team was originally going to be called the Spokane Shock after the owner of the franchise decided to leave the Arena Football League on September 1, 2015, for the IFL  due to easier regional travel. However, on October 12, 2015, the AFL released a statement saying that the franchise and the AFL could not come to terms over the purchase and use of the Shock identity (name, logos, colors, etc.) and that the AFL has retained the rights to the identity. In addition, the IFL accepted the expansion franchise of the Minnesota Havok. Two teams retained their locations but changed their team name; the former Colorado Ice changed its name to the Colorado Crush, and the former Bemidji Axemen changed their name to the Minnesota Axemen.

The IFL originally announced that it would continue with a two-conference format, but would return to having two divisions in each conference, with each of the 12 teams playing 16 games during the 18-week regular season. This was two more teams, games, and weeks than the numbers as played in the 2015 IFL season. However, prior to the season, the league terminated the two Minnesota teams and returned to a division-less two conference format.

Expansion/Contraction
On September 9, 2015, the IFL announced the Minnesota Havok would join the league for the 2016 season. The Havok were to play their home games at Verizon Wireless Center in Mankato, Minnesota, however, the league terminated the franchise prior to the start of the season for failing to meet league obligations.

On November 25, 2015, the Minnesota Axemen franchise was terminated by the league for failing to meet the league's operational standards and  commitments.

Standings

Playoffs

Awards

Individual season awards

1st Team All-IFL

2nd Team All-IFL

References